Konkomba may refer to:

Konkomba people, an ethnic group of Ghana, Togo and Burkina Faso
Konkomba language spoken by this people